The Treaty of Töplitz (other spellings: Treaty of Toeplitz, Treaty of Toplitz) was signed in Töplitz on 9 September 1813, between Russia, Austria, and Prussia. The purpose of the agreement was to establish and strengthen a united coalition force against Napoleon I of France. Based on the terms of the accord, all signatories agreed to support each other with 60,000 troops. Another Treaty of Töplitz was signed between Great Britain and Austria.

See also
List of treaties

References

Sources
Clare, Israel Smith. Library of Universal History: Containing a Record of the Human Race from the Earliest Historical Period to the Present Time Embracing a General Survey of the Progress of Mankind in National and Social Life, Civil Government, Religion, Literature, Science and Art. R. S. Peale, J. A. Hill, 1897 (Original from the New York Public Library).

1813 in the Austrian Empire
1813 in Prussia
1813 in the Russian Empire
1813 treaties
Treaties of the Austrian Empire
Treaties of the United Kingdom (1801–1922)
Treaties of the Russian Empire
Treaties of the Kingdom of Prussia
Military alliances involving Austria
Military alliances involving Russia
Military alliances involving Prussia
September 1813 events
Austrian Empire–Prussia relations
Austrian Empire–Russia relations
Prussia–Russia relations